In statistics, the mean signed difference (MSD), also known as mean signed deviation and mean signed error, is a sample statistic that summarises how well a set of estimates  match the quantities  that they are supposed to estimate. It is one of a number of statistics that can be used to assess an estimation procedure, and it would often be used in conjunction with a sample version of the mean square error.

For example, suppose a linear regression model has been estimated over a sample of data, and is then used to extrapolate predictions of the dependent variable out of sample after the out-of-sample data points have become available. Then  would be the i-th out-of-sample value of the dependent variable, and  would be its predicted value. The mean signed deviation is the average value of

Definition

The mean signed difference is derived from a set of n pairs, where  is an estimate of the parameter  in a case where it is known that .  In many applications, all the quantities  will share a common value. When applied to forecasting in a time series analysis context, a forecasting procedure might be evaluated using the mean signed difference, with   being the predicted value of a series at a given lead time and  being the value of the series eventually observed for that time-point. The mean signed difference is defined to be

See also
Bias of an estimator
Deviation (statistics)
Mean absolute difference
Mean absolute error

Summary statistics
Means
Distance